Hampton High School is an accredited comprehensive public high school serving students in grades nine through twelve in Hampton, Arkansas, United States. Administered by the Hampton School District as the sole public high school in Calhoun County, Arkansas, the district encompasses  of land including Hampton and all or portions of Harrell, Tinsman, and Camden.

Academics 
The Hampton High School is accredited by the Arkansas Department of Education (ADE).

Curriculum 
The assumed course of study follows the Smart Core curriculum developed the Arkansas Department of Education (ADE), which requires students to complete at least 22 credit units before graduation. Students engage in regular and career focus courses and exams and may select Advanced Placement (AP) coursework and exams that provide an opportunity to receive college credit. According to the student handbook, exceptional students may be awarded an Honors Graduates based on participation in 10 advanced courses, two credits in foreign language and a 3.5 grade point average (GPA).

Athletics 
The Hampton High School mascot is the Bulldog with school colors of black, white, and gold.

For the 2012–14 school years, the Hampton Bulldogs participate in the 2A Classification within the 2A Region 8 Conference (football) and 2A Region 7 West Conference (basketball) as administered by the Arkansas Activities Association. The Bulldogs compete in various interscholastic activities including football, basketball (boys/girls), baseball, fastpitch softball, tennis (boys/girls), and cheer.

Notable alumni 
 Charles B. Pierce—American film director, screenwriter, producer, set decorator, cinematographer and actor.
 Harry Thomason—American film and television director and producer.

References

External links 
 

Public high schools in Arkansas
Schools in Calhoun County, Arkansas
High School (Arkansas)